Luis Henrique Tomaz de Lima (born 14 December 1867), commonly known as Luis Henrique, is a Brazilian professional footballer who plays as a forward for Campeonato Brasileiro Série A Botafogo, on loan from Ligue 1 club OM.

Career 
Henrique started his career at Três Passos, before moving to Botafogo. He joined French club Marseille in a deal reportedly worth around €8 million on 25 September 2020, and chose the number 11 shirt.

On 22 July 2022, Henrique was loaned back to Botafogo.

Career statistics

References

External links
 Marseille profile
 

2001 births
Living people
Brazilian footballers
Association football forwards
Campeonato Brasileiro Série A players
Ligue 1 players
Botafogo de Futebol e Regatas players
Olympique de Marseille players
Brazilian expatriate footballers
Brazilian expatriate sportspeople in France
Expatriate footballers in France